The Yeniseysk constituency (No.56) is a Russian legislative constituency in Krasnoyarsk Krai. The constituency covers more than 3/4 territory of the region, mostly northern sparsely populated Krasnoyarsk Krai. Until 2007 the constituency stretched southward to Kansk but lost this part to Krasnoyarsk constituency in 2015. However, Yeniseysk constituency picked Norilsk and the territory of former Evenk and Taymyr constituencies.

Members elected

Election results

1993

|-
! colspan=2 style="background-color:#E9E9E9;text-align:left;vertical-align:top;" |Candidate
! style="background-color:#E9E9E9;text-align:left;vertical-align:top;" |Party
! style="background-color:#E9E9E9;text-align:right;" |Votes
! style="background-color:#E9E9E9;text-align:right;" |%
|-
|style="background-color:"|
|align=left|Anatoly Yaroshenko
|align=left|Agrarian Party
|
|32.45%
|-
|style="background-color:"|
|align=left|Sergey Peshkov
|align=left|Independent
| -
|31.70%
|-
| colspan="5" style="background-color:#E9E9E9;"|
|- style="font-weight:bold"
| colspan="3" style="text-align:left;" | Total
| 
| 100%
|-
| colspan="5" style="background-color:#E9E9E9;"|
|- style="font-weight:bold"
| colspan="4" |Source:
|
|}

1995

|-
! colspan=2 style="background-color:#E9E9E9;text-align:left;vertical-align:top;" |Candidate
! style="background-color:#E9E9E9;text-align:left;vertical-align:top;" |Party
! style="background-color:#E9E9E9;text-align:right;" |Votes
! style="background-color:#E9E9E9;text-align:right;" |%
|-
|style="background-color:"|
|align=left|Anatoly Yaroshenko (incumbent)
|align=left|Agrarian Party
|
|31.58%
|-
|style="background-color:"|
|align=left|Sergey Peshkov
|align=left|Independent
|
|17.24%
|-
|style="background-color:"|
|align=left|Yury Ivanov
|align=left|Our Home – Russia
|
|16.24%
|-
|style="background-color:#2C299A"|
|align=left|Feliks Pashennykh
|align=left|Congress of Russian Communities
|
|8.72%
|-
|style="background-color:#DA2021"|
|align=left|Aleksandr Lambin
|align=left|Ivan Rybkin Bloc
|
|4.56%
|-
|style="background-color:"|
|align=left|Yury Luchkin
|align=left|Independent
|
|3.90%
|-
|style="background-color:#000000"|
|colspan=2 |against all
|
|15.82%
|-
| colspan="5" style="background-color:#E9E9E9;"|
|- style="font-weight:bold"
| colspan="3" style="text-align:left;" | Total
| 
| 100%
|-
| colspan="5" style="background-color:#E9E9E9;"|
|- style="font-weight:bold"
| colspan="4" |Source:
|
|}

1999

|-
! colspan=2 style="background-color:#E9E9E9;text-align:left;vertical-align:top;" |Candidate
! style="background-color:#E9E9E9;text-align:left;vertical-align:top;" |Party
! style="background-color:#E9E9E9;text-align:right;" |Votes
! style="background-color:#E9E9E9;text-align:right;" |%
|-
|style="background-color:"|
|align=left|Pyotr Romanov
|align=left|Communist Party
|
|37.39%
|-
|style="background-color:"|
|align=left|Igor Isakov
|align=left|Independent
|
|19.43%
|-
|style="background-color:"|
|align=left|Nikolay Plotnikov
|align=left|Liberal Democratic Party
|
|12.92%
|-
|style="background-color:"|
|align=left|Vladimir Leopa
|align=left|Independent
|
|10.30%
|-
|style="background-color:"|
|align=left|Anatoly Yaroshenko (incumbent)
|align=left|Independent
|
|4.75%
|-
|style="background-color:#000000"|
|colspan=2 |against all
|
|13.11%
|-
| colspan="5" style="background-color:#E9E9E9;"|
|- style="font-weight:bold"
| colspan="3" style="text-align:left;" | Total
| 
| 100%
|-
| colspan="5" style="background-color:#E9E9E9;"|
|- style="font-weight:bold"
| colspan="4" |Source:
|
|}

2003

|-
! colspan=2 style="background-color:#E9E9E9;text-align:left;vertical-align:top;" |Candidate
! style="background-color:#E9E9E9;text-align:left;vertical-align:top;" |Party
! style="background-color:#E9E9E9;text-align:right;" |Votes
! style="background-color:#E9E9E9;text-align:right;" |%
|-
|style="background-color: " |
|align=left|Igor Isakov
|align=left|United Russia
|
|30.78%
|-
|style="background-color:"|
|align=left|Pyotr Romanov (incumbent)
|align=left|Communist Party
|
|27.79%
|-
|style="background-color:"|
|align=left|Aleksandr Mnogogreshnov
|align=left|Independent
|
|12.22%
|-
|style="background-color:"|
|align=left|Sergey Tsukanov
|align=left|Agrarian Party
|
|8.30%
|-
|style="background-color:"|
|align=left|Sergey Kaspirovich
|align=left|Liberal Democratic Party
|
|4.33%
|-
|style="background-color:"|
|align=left|Anatoly Shevchenko
|align=left|Independent
|
|1.27%
|-
|style="background-color:#164C8C"|
|align=left|Vasily Kovalev
|align=left|United Russian Party Rus'
|
|1.05%
|-
|style="background-color:#00A1FF"|
|align=left|Sergey Natarov
|align=left|Party of Russia's Rebirth-Russian Party of Life
|
|0.85%
|-
|style="background-color:#000000"|
|colspan=2 |against all
|
|11.68%
|-
| colspan="5" style="background-color:#E9E9E9;"|
|- style="font-weight:bold"
| colspan="3" style="text-align:left;" | Total
| 
| 100%
|-
| colspan="5" style="background-color:#E9E9E9;"|
|- style="font-weight:bold"
| colspan="4" |Source:
|
|}

2016

|-
! colspan=2 style="background-color:#E9E9E9;text-align:left;vertical-align:top;" |Candidate
! style="background-color:#E9E9E9;text-align:left;vertical-align:top;" |Party
! style="background-color:#E9E9E9;text-align:right;" |Votes
! style="background-color:#E9E9E9;text-align:right;" |%
|-
|style="background-color: " |
|align=left|Raisa Karmazina
|align=left|United Russia
|
|48.41%
|-
|style="background-color:"|
|align=left|Sergey Natarov
|align=left|Liberal Democratic Party
|
|13.41%
|-
|style="background-color:"|
|align=left|Pyotr Polezhayev
|align=left|Communist Party
|
|10.84%
|-
|style="background-color: "|
|align=left|Aleksandr Dyakov
|align=left|Rodina
|
|5.46%
|-
|style="background:"| 
|align=left|Andrey Seleznev
|align=left|Communists of Russia
|
|4.86%
|-
|style="background-color:"|
|align=left|Aleksandr Lympio
|align=left|A Just Russia
|
|4.00%
|-
|style="background-color: "|
|align=left|Olga Lanovaya
|align=left|Civic Platform
|
|2.58%
|-
|style="background-color:"|
|align=left|Tatyana Rykunova
|align=left|Patriots of Russia
|
|2.57%
|-
|style="background-color:"|
|align=left|Artyom Kardanets
|align=left|The Greens
|
|2.28%
|-
| colspan="5" style="background-color:#E9E9E9;"|
|- style="font-weight:bold"
| colspan="3" style="text-align:left;" | Total
| 
| 100%
|-
| colspan="5" style="background-color:#E9E9E9;"|
|- style="font-weight:bold"
| colspan="4" |Source:
|
|}

2021

|-
! colspan=2 style="background-color:#E9E9E9;text-align:left;vertical-align:top;" |Candidate
! style="background-color:#E9E9E9;text-align:left;vertical-align:top;" |Party
! style="background-color:#E9E9E9;text-align:right;" |Votes
! style="background-color:#E9E9E9;text-align:right;" |%
|-
|style="background-color: " |
|align=left|Aleksey Veller
|align=left|United Russia
|
|36.86%
|-
|style="background-color:"|
|align=left|Vitaly Makarov
|align=left|Communist Party
|
|15.57%
|-
|style="background-color:"|
|align=left|Dmitry Dubrov
|align=left|A Just Russia — For Truth
|
|9.54%
|-
|style="background-color:"|
|align=left|Aleksandr Stogny
|align=left|Liberal Democratic Party
|
|8.06%
|-
|style="background-color:"|
|align=left|Irina Ivanova
|align=left|The Greens
|
|7.82%
|-
|style="background-color: " |
|align=left|Olga Rychkova
|align=left|New People
|
|6.91%
|-
|style="background-color: "|
|align=left|Mikhail Orda
|align=left|Party of Pensioners
|
|4.87%
|-
|style="background:"| 
|align=left|Igor Shmarlovsky
|align=left|Communists of Russia
|
|4.82%
|-
| colspan="5" style="background-color:#E9E9E9;"|
|- style="font-weight:bold"
| colspan="3" style="text-align:left;" | Total
| 
| 100%
|-
| colspan="5" style="background-color:#E9E9E9;"|
|- style="font-weight:bold"
| colspan="4" |Source:
|
|}

Notes

References

Russian legislative constituencies
Politics of Krasnoyarsk Krai